The Pennington Cottage is a historic home located at Deer Park, Garrett County, Maryland, United States. It is a -story, late-19th-century Shingle-Style frame structure, with a gambrel roof and a one-story porch that stretches across the principal facade and along portions of the sides. The house is entirely covered with dark wood shingles. It was built as a part of the Baltimore and Ohio Railroad's Deer Park Hotel complex, as the summer home of Baltimore architect Josias Pennington (d. 1929).

Pennington Cottage was listed on the National Register of Historic Places in 1976, and then was "by far the best preserved of the [hotel] complex" structures It is currently used as a bed-and-breakfast inn.

References

External links
, including photo from 1975, at Maryland Historical Trust

Houses on the National Register of Historic Places in Maryland
Houses in Garrett County, Maryland
Shingle Style houses
National Register of Historic Places in Garrett County, Maryland
Shingle Style architecture in Maryland